Association Sportive de Monaco Football Club is a French–listed football club, located in Monaco. They received entry to their first European competition, the European Cup, after being crowned as winners of the league in 1961. The side qualified for the beginning round, the preliminary stage, where they were beaten 4–6 on aggregate by Scottish opponents Rangers in both legs of the tie, 2–3 at home, and 3–2 on foreign ground. As runners-up of the French annual cup, the Coupe de France, AS Monaco added their name to a second European tournament, the 1974–75 European Cup Winners' Cup, also exiting in the first phase against Eintracht Frankfurt with a 2–5 total score.

The outfit achieved their best results in the 1991–92 European Cup Winners' Cup, being defeated in the final 0–2 contrary to Werder Bremen, and the 2003–04 UEFA Champions League, where they suffered a 0–3 loss to Porto. AS Monaco recorded their highest win against Swansea City of Wales with 8–0 at the Stade Louis II in the first phase, second leg of the 1991–92 Cup Winners' Cup. Their largest deficit was against another Scottish club, Dundee United, in the 1981–82 UEFA Cup first home round which they lost 2–5. The club's latest participation is in the 2022–23 UEFA Europa League knockout round play-offs.

Matches

Overall record

By competition

By country

Notes

References

External links
 

AS Monaco FC
Monaco